Ernesto Padova (17 February 1845 – 9 March 1896) was an Italian mathematician born in Livorno.

Biography
He graduated at the University of Pisa in 1866 but he was also a student of the Scuola Normale of Pisa. He first taught in a high school in Naples and in 1872, having been put forward by Enrico Betti, he was appointed professor of rational mechanics at the University of Pisa. From there he moved on to Padua, where he remained until his premature death.

He has been author of about fifty works in the fields of mathematical analysis, analytical mechanics and mathematical-physics (elasticity and electromagnetism). Regards to analytical mechanics Padova has been one of the first to study matters concerning movement stability. In this field, among his students was Tullio Levi-Civita.

In 1891 he also became a member of the Accademia dei Lincei.

Notes

External links

An Italian short biography of Ernesto Padova in Edizione Nazionale Mathematica Italiana online.

1845 births
1896 deaths
Mathematical physicists
19th-century Italian mathematicians
University of Pisa
University of Padua